Bill Baird (born July 26, 1949) is an American race car driver. He currently competes in the Ultra4 Racing Series in the #5252 buggy. He is a former Rookie of the Year and champion of the ARCA Bondo/Mar-Hyde stock car Series, and owns Saturn Machine, a steel equipment manufacturer.

Early career 
Baird, an Air Force veteran, originally began as a stunt pilot hobbyist before later switching to racing in 1987. After starting on dirt oval tracks, he switched to pavement racetracks and competed regularly in the American Speed Association ACDelco Challenge Series.

ARCA career 
Baird debuted in the ARCA Bondo/Mar-Hyde Series in 1997, driving the #52 for Ken Schrader Racing with sponsorship from Saturn Machine and Spee Dee Pop Popcorn. He made four starts, with his best finish coming in his debut at Daytona International Speedway, where he started third and finished fourth. He made his first full-time bid at the ARCA championship the following season, winning two pole positions and nine top-ten finishes, on his way to a fourth-place position in the points standings and the ARCA Rookie of the Year award. In 1999, Baird ran a full-time schedule for the second time, with additional sponsorship coming from Valvoline Eagle One, Baird won his first five races and the overall points championship.

The next season, Baird cut down to a part-time schedule, this time driving the #52 as an owner/driver. He made six starts and garnered three top-ten finishes, including a 2nd at the Illinois State Fairgrounds. He also attempted the Pennsylvania 500 and Brickyard 400 in the NASCAR Winston Cup Series that season, but failed to qualify for both events. Following 2000, Baird reunited with Schrader but only attempted a handful of events in the ARCA series each year. He won an additional race at the Illinois State Fairgrounds in 2004, his final career ARCA victory to date. His most recent start in the ARCA series came in 2010 at Talladega Superspeedway, where he finished 27th after wrecking halfway through the race.

Post-ARCA career 
In 2011, Baird purchased an Ultra 4 Buggy from Campbell Enterprises, racing the rest of the 2011 Ultra 4 Series in preparation for the 2012 Griffin King of the Hammers. He was named the Ultra 4 Series Rookie of the Year that same season.

Motorsports career results

NASCAR
(key) (Bold – Pole position awarded by qualifying time. Italics – Pole position earned by points standings or practice time. * – Most laps led.)

Winston Cup Series

ARCA Racing Series
(key) (Bold – Pole position awarded by qualifying time. Italics – Pole position earned by points standings or practice time. * – Most laps led.)

References

External links 
 Bill Baird Motorsports
 

1949 births
ARCA Menards Series drivers
American Speed Association drivers
Living people